The 2020–21 West Virginia Mountaineers women's basketball team represented West Virginia University during the 2020–21 NCAA Division I women's basketball season. The Mountaineers were coached by twentieth-year head coach Mike Carey, played their home games at WVU Coliseum and were members of the Big 12 Conference.

They finished the season 22–7, 13–5 in Big 12 play to finish in a tie for second place.  As the second seed in the Big 12 Tournament, they defeated Kansas State and Oklahoma State before losing to Baylor in the Final.  They received an at-large bid to the NCAA tournament.  As the four seed in the HemisFair Regional they defeated  before losing to Georgia Tech in the Second Round to end their season.

Previous season
The Mountaineers finished the season 17–12, 7–11 in Big 12 play to finish in a tie for sixth place. The Big 12 Tournament, NCAA women's basketball tournament and WNIT were all cancelled before they began due to the COVID-19 pandemic.

Roster

Schedule
Source:

|-
!colspan=6 style=| Regular season

|-
!colspan=6 style=| Big 12 Women's Tournament

|-
!colspan=6 style=| NCAA tournament

Rankings

References

West Virginia Mountaineers women's basketball
West Virginia
West Virginia Mountaineers women's basketball
West Virginia Mountaineers women's basketball
West Virginia